Muhamad Syazani Bin Mat Puat (born 20 May 1994) is a Malaysian professional footballer who plays for Malaysian club Perlis as a goalkeeper.

References

External links
 

1994 births
Living people
Malaysian footballers
Perak F.C. players
People from Perak
Malaysia Super League players
Association football goalkeepers